Exequiel Mereles de la Quintana (born 16 September 2005) is a Uruguayan footballer who plays as a forward for Atenas.

Career statistics

Club

Notes

References

2005 births
Living people
People from San Carlos, Uruguay
Association football forwards
Uruguayan footballers
Uruguayan Segunda División players
Atenas de San Carlos players